The 1978–79 All-Ireland Senior Club Hurling Championship was the ninth season of the All-Ireland Senior Club Hurling Championship, the Gaelic Athletic Association's premier club hurling tournament. The All-Ireland series began on 28 January 1979 and ended on 25 March 1979.

St. Finbarr's were the defending champions, however, they failed to qualify. Blackrock won the title after defeating Ballyhale Shamrocks by 5-7 to 5-5 in the final.

Results

Leinster Senior Club Hurling Championship

First round

Quarter-finals

Semi-finals

Final

Munster Senior Club Hurling Championship

Quarter-finals

Semi-finals

Final

All-Ireland Senior Club Hurling Championship

Quarter-final

Semi-finals

Final

Statistics

Miscellaneous

 Blackrock become the first team to win three All-Ireland titles. John Horgan was the captain for all three victories making him the only three-time All-Ireland-winning captain.

References

1978 in hurling
1979 in hurling
All-Ireland Senior Club Hurling Championship